The Limes Arabicus was a desert frontier of the Roman Empire, running north from its start in the province of Arabia Petraea. It had several forts and watchtowers.

The reason of this defensive limes was to protect the Roman province of Arabia from attacks of the nomadic tribes of the Arabian desert. The main purpose of the Limes Arabicus is disputed; it may have been used both to defend from Arab raids and to protect the commercial trade routes from  robbers.

Built between 111 and 114 AD, its primary purpose may have been to provide efficient transportation for troop movements and government officials as well as facilitating and protecting trade caravans emerging from the Arabian Peninsula. It was completed under Emperor Hadrian.

Fortification
During the Severan dynasty (AD 193–235), the Romans strengthened their defences on the Arabian frontier. They constructed several castra (forts) at the northwest end of the Wadi Sirhan, and improved the roads. One important fort was Qasr Azraq, another was at Humeima (Latin: Auara), from the late 2nd century AD, on the Via Traiana Nova from Petra to Aila, where up to 500 auxiliary troops could have resided. It was probably abandoned in the fourth century.

Emperor Diocletian partitioned the old province of Arabia by transferring the southern region to the province of Palaestina. Later in the 4th century, Palaestina was made into three provinces, and the southern one was eventually called Palaestina Tertia. Each province was administered by a praeses with civil authority and a dux with military authority.

Diocletian engaged in a major military expansion in the region, building a number of castella, watchtowers, and fortresses along the fringe of the desert just east of the Via Nova. This line of defence extended from south of Damascus to Wadi al-Hasa. The region from Wadi Mujib to Wadi al-Hasa contained four castella and a legionary camp. The frontier south of Wadi al-Hasa, which extended to the Red Sea at Aila (Aqaba), may have been called the Limes Palaestina. In this region, ten castella and a legionary camp have been identified. The term may have referred to a series of fortifications and roads in the northern Negev, running from Rafah on the Mediterranean to the Dead Sea, or to the region under the military control of the dux Palaestinae, the military governor of the Palaestinian provinces.

Personnel
There were castra every  with the purpose to create a line of protection and control: in the south there was the legionary fortress at Adrou (Udruh), just east of Petra. It probably housed the Legio VI Ferrata, which was moved from Lajjun (in modern-day Israel) by Diocletian. It is similar to Betthorus (al-Lajjun in modern-day Jordan) in size and design, and is in the plain of Moab, south of Wadi Mujib . Alistair Killick, who excavated the site, dates it to the early 2nd century, but Parker suggests a date in the late 3rd or early 4th century.

A legionary camp may have also existed at Aila (modern Aqaba), which has been excavated by Parker since 1994. The city was located at the north end of the Gulf of Aqaba where it was a centre of sea traffic. Several land routes also intersected here. Legio X Fretensis, originally stationed in Jerusalem, was transferred here to the terminus of the Via Nova. So far, a stone curtain wall and projecting tower have been identified, but it is uncertain whether they were part of the city wall of Aila or the fortress. The evidence suggests the fort was constructed in the late 4th or early 5th century.

Troops were progressively withdrawn from the Limes Arabicus in the first half of the 6th century and replaced with native Arab foederati, chiefly the Ghassanids. After the Muslim Arab conquest, the Limes Arabicus was largely left to disappear, though some fortifications were used and reinforced in the following centuries.

History
The limes was overrun in 611 during the war with the Sasanians.

See also
 Strata Diocletiana
 Roman Arabia
 Via Traiana Nova
 Sassanian defense lines#Wall of the Arabs
 Walls-of-the-Ruler

References

Bibliography
 
 Graf, D. The Via Militaris and the Limes Arabicus in "Roman Frontier Studies 1995": Proceedings of the XVIth International Congress of Roman Frontier Studies, ed. W. Groenman-van Waateringe, B. L. van Beek, W. J. H. Willems, and S. L. Wynia. Oxbow Monograph 91. Oxford: Oxbow Books.
 Gregory, Shelagh, Kennedy, David and Stein, Aurel, Sir Aurel Stein's Limes Report: Part 1 & 2 (British Archaeological Reports (BAR), 1985)
 Gregory, S. Was There an Eastern Origin for the Design of Late Roman Fortifications?: Some Problems for Research on Forts of Rome's Eastern Frontier in "The Roman Army in the East", ed. D. L. Kennedy. Journal of Roman Archaeology Supplementary Series, 18. Ann Arbor, MI: Journal of Roman Archaeology.
 Isaac, B. The Limits of Empire: The Roman Army in the East Clarendon Press. Oxford, 1990.
 
 Parker, S. The Roman Frontier in Central Jordan Interim Report on the Limes Arabicus Project, 1980–1985. BAR International Series, 340. British Archaeological Reports. Oxford, 1987
 Young, Gary K. Rome's Eastern Trade: International commerce and imperial policy, 31 BC – AD 305 Routledge. London, 2001
 Welsby, D. Qasr al-Uwainid and Da'ajaniya: Two Roman Military Sites in Jordan Levant 30: 195–8. Oxford, 1990

External links
 Forts of the Limes Arabicus, from Virtual Karak Resources Project
 Qasr Bsshir (Roman castrum)

Roman frontiers
Roman fortifications in Roman Syria
Roman fortifications in Syria
Roman fortifications in Arabia Petraea
Wadi Sirhan